Philadelphia's Greek Mob, also known as the Philadelphia Greek Mafia or simply the Greek Mafia, are a low-profile criminal organization of ethnic Greek Americans in Philadelphia with alleged connections to the Italian Philadelphia crime family and the Greek Velentzas crime family of New York city.

History 

The Greek Mob was formed in southern Greece by the original boss Steve Pattakos. Pattakos also had strong ties with the Karakostas and Efthimiades families of Macedonia in Northern Greece. When the Karakostas family was run out of power in the 1960s, Pattakos decided to move his operations to the culturally diverse America. When Pattakos was sentenced to jail to serve life for murder, mobster Chelsais "Steve" Bouras of Upper Northeast Philadelphia took over.

Throughout the 1970s until 1981, Bouras headed the Greek Mob in Philadelphia, participating in mostly loansharking, extortion, methamphetamine trade, and illegal gambling. Bouras directed the mob efficiently, and he carried out business with more prominent families such as the Philadelphia Mafia. He was a close associate of Italian wiseguy and Scarfo soldier Raymond Martorano.

Assassination of Bouras 

On May 27, 1981, at the Venetis Greek restaurant in South Philadelphia, Bouras and his girlfriend, Jeannette Curro, were gunned down while dining with Ray Martorano and Philadelphia radio personality Jerry Blavat.

Bouras was 50 years old and Jeannette Curro was 54. Though Bouras and Curro were killed, Martorano and Blavat were only wounded. It is reported that Nicodemo Scarfo of Philadelphia's notorious Philadelphia crime family ordered the hit, as Bouras had refused to pay Scarfo's street taxes, specifically for his meth ring. There have also been speculations that Martorano arranged the hit for Scarfo because of eyewitness claims that the gunman motioned for Martorano to move out of the way before opening fire. To this day, no one has ever been connected with the hit. The assassination took place just one day after the murder of another Greek mobster, Harry Boulas of Upper Darby. 

Curro's family also had ties to the Mafia; the FBI had been investigating her nephew, Joe "Crutch" Curro, a made member of the Philadelphia Cosa Nostra, after they recorded him on a 1976 FBI wiretap at Frank’s Cabana Steaks in South Philadelphia, at the time a base of operations for Philadelphia Mafia capo Frank Sindone. 

After Bouras' assassination, the Greek Mob did get involved with the mob war in Philadelphia in the 1980s, attempting to gain rackets in Atlantic City, but activity declined after the war.  They were also involved in the high profile prosecution of Mafia lawyer Robert F. Simone in 1994. Simone was a close associate in the 1980s.

A two-year FBI investigation into a cocaine ring run by the Greek mafia in Baltimore, Philadelphia, and Washington, D.C. resulted in charges being filed in August 1987.

Current activity 

Although rather prominent in the 1970s and 1980s, the Greek Mob has cooled down and remains rather dormant. However, there have been some occurrences of members being found loan sharking in Philadelphia in modern times. The reason for this dormant period could be traced back to the leaders' loss in the 1980s mob war in Philadelphia, which was initiated after Martineos' assassination.

References 

Greek-American organized crime groups
Gangs in Philadelphia
Greek-American culture in Pennsylvania